Chavelkan-e Hajji (also Romanized as Chāvelkān-e Ḩājjī, Chāvlakān-e Ḩājjī, Chavlakan Haji, and Chāvalkān-e Ḩājjī; also known as Chābalkan Ḩājjī, Chābolakān Hajī, Chābolkān-e Ḩājī, Chābolkān Ḩājjī, Chāvolkān, and Chawalakān) is a village in Kalatrazan Rural District, Kalatrazan District, Sanandaj County, Kurdistan Province, Iran. At the 2006 census, its population was 373, in 77 families. The village is populated by Kurds.

References 

Towns and villages in Sanandaj County
Kurdish settlements in Kurdistan Province